Monica Baskin is an American psychologist who is a professor of medicine at the University of Alabama at Birmingham. Her research considers health disparities in the Deep South. She serves as Director of Community Outreach and Engagement at the O'Neal Comprehensive Cancer Center.

Early life and education 
Baskin grew up in Southwest Atlanta. Her mother and father were from rural Georgia and Alabama. Her father was diagnosed with eye neoplasm when she was a child, and ultimately lost his eye. Baskin has said that she remembers being told that she “would need to be 'twice as good' as her white peers in order to be as successful,”. She studied psychology and sociology at Emory University. She moved to Georgia State University for her graduate studies, where she earned a master's degree in community counselling. She remained at Georgia State for her doctoral research, where she studied public health interventions for adolescents diagnosed with sickle cell disease. After losing her father to cancer whilst she was still at high school, Baskin became interested in why physical and psychological distress was still so taboo in communities of colour. Like many other African-Americans, her father was only diagnosed with cancer when he was at stage 4, which meant that death was inevitable. She has said that she was motivated to work on health disparities because she realised that there weren't many people who looked like her in the field. She was sponsored by the National Institute on Minority Health and Health Disparities Loan Repayment Programme which allows scientists studying health disparities to start their independent research careers without student loan debt. After graduating, Baskin returned to Emory University, where she was awarded a paediatric psychology fellowship. In 1997 Baskin was made a Minority Fellow of the American Psychological Association.

Research and career 
Baskin is a psychologist who investigates the physical and mental health of minorities. Her research considers how lifestyle impacts medical outcomes, and how behavioural interventions can help to mitigate health disparities.

In 2013 Baskin coordinated the report “PLACE MATTERS for Health in Jefferson County, Alabama: The Status of Health Equity on the 50th Anniversary of the Civil Rights Movement in Birmingham, Alabama”. The report was released fifty years after the protests in Birmingham marking when the Jim Crow laws were overruled. The report collected information of life expectancy, infant mortality and access to healthy food in various areas across the county, and studied how they depended on the demographics of the communities (including ethnicity and socioeconomic status). She identified that Black mothers in Jefferson County were 2.5 times more likely to die during child birth as white mothers, and that Black households in Jefferson County had annual incomes $22,000 below the federal poverty guideline. The report made a series of recommendations, including funding early childhood education programmes, implementing financial programmes to provide healthy food in poor neighbourhoods and expanding Medicaid.

In 2015 Baskin was awarded an National Cancer Institute grant to develop strategies to prevent obesity in African American women. Her research has shown the close relationships between cancer and obesity, and identified that African American women are most at risk.

Baskin is Chair of the Jefferson County Collaborative for Health Equity, an organisation which looks to eliminate health disparities through public policy. In 2020 she was elected President of the Society of Behavioral Medicine.

Selected publications

Awards and honours 
 1997 American Psychological Association Minority Fellow
 2007 Jefferson County Public Health Hero Awards
 2013 University of Alabama Institute for Rural Health Research Rural Health Heroes Award
 2016 Max Cooper Award for Excellence in Research
 2016 Robert Wood Johnson Foundation (RWJF) Culture of Health Leader
 2017 Fellow of the Society of Behavioral Medicine

Personal life 
Baskin has two daughters. One of her daughters, Kennedy, studied neuroscience at Emory University.

References 

Living people
Year of birth missing (living people)
Public health researchers
Emory University alumni
University of Alabama faculty
Georgia State University alumni
African-American women academics
American women academics
African-American academics
21st-century African-American people
21st-century African-American women